MJ may refer to:

Fictional characters
 M.J. Delfino, in Desperate Housewives
 Mary Jane Watson, in Marvel comics
 Mary Jane Watson (Sam Raimi film series), the film adaptation of the character
 MJ (Marvel Cinematic Universe), a character in the Marvel Cinematic Universe
 Agent MJ, in the film Miss Cast Away and the Island Girls, played by Michael Jackson

People
 
 MJ (South Korean singer) (Kim Myung-jun, born 1994), a South Korean singer, actor, and model 
 MJ Acosta (fl. from 2016), a Dominican-American sports reporter 
 MJ Cole (born 1973), English DJ and record producer
 MJ Delaney, British television director
 MJ Erb (born 1994), American long-distance runner
 MJ Hegar (born 1976), American U.S. Air Force veteran and former political candidate
 MJ Hibbett (born 1970), English guitarist singer-songwriter
 MJ Lee (born 1987), American political correspondent 
 MJ Long (1939–2018), American architect, lecturer and author
 MJ Mentz (born 1982), South African rugby player 
 MJ Pelser (born 1998), South African rugby player
 Mj Rodriguez (born 1991), American actress and singer
 MJ Williams (born 1995), Welsh footballer 
 Mahan Mj (born 1968), Indian mathematician and monk
 Michael Jackson (1958–2009), American singer, songwriter, and dancer
 MJ the Musical, a 2022 Broadway musical centered on Michael Jackson
 MJ (album), the cast album to the musical
 Michael Jordan (born 1963), American businessman and former professional basketball player

Science
 Megajoule (MJ), or millijoule (mJ), units of energy 
 Jupiter mass (MJ), a unit of mass

Transportation
 Manufacturers' Junction Railway, near Cicero, Illinois, U.S., reporting mark MJ
 Líneas Aéreas Privadas Argentinas, a former Argentinian airline, IATA airline code MJ
 Jeep Comanche, designated MJ, a pickup truck
 MJ (New York City Subway service), a defunct subway service in New York City, US

Other uses

 The MJ, a short name for The Municipal Journal, a United Kingdom publication about local democracy and civic administration
 Maillot jaune or yellow jersey, worn by the leader of the Tour de France cycling stage race
 Master of Jurisprudence, a Master's degree
 West's Military Justice Reporter (cited as M.J.), official reporter of the U.S. Court of Appeals for the Armed Forces

See also
 
 Emjay (born 1974), a Canadian eurodance musician
 Ɱ, the letter M with hook